

 is a Japanese writer of non-fiction. She is known for titillating novels replete with interracial sex scenes, and has aroused a great deal of controversy in Japan; her works have been accused of "demonising female sexuality". She rose to public prominence through her 1986 book Gang Wives, about the girlfriends and spouses of yakuza. She spent nearly a year getting to know her subjects, and had also been shot at during the course of writing the book. It was later adapted as a television series by Tōei starring Shima Iwashita, and as a series of Gokudo no Onna-tachi movies starring Reiko Takashima. Her books continued to receive a good popular reception and be made into movies; her 1990 Hug Me, Kiss Me was awarded the 22nd Ohya Non-fiction Prize in 1991. Hug Me, Kiss Me was an account of her time volunteering in organization offering assistance to AIDS patients while living in Savannah, Georgia in 1987, along with an epilogue about the risk AIDS posed to Japanese tourists in Hawaii; its cinematic adaptation was the first film in Japan to openly address AIDS. However, her descriptions of the African American community were accused of making AIDS seem "alien" and "distant" to her Japanese target audience.

Ieda's later works continued her practice of touching on contentious themes; her 1991 book Yellow Cab, about the eponymous stereotype of Japanese women overseas who allegedly engaged in indiscriminate sex with foreigners, attracted a great deal of media attention in Japan, including two television documentaries by TV Asahi and Tokyo Broadcasting System. George Sarratt, her research assistant for the book, later denounced major portions as "fraudulent", even indicating that she had altered direct quotes from interviewees. Japanese women in New York also set up a protest group against the book, feeling that the stereotype had damaged their professional image; their activities, which were described as "Ieda-bashing" by one scholar studying the "yellow cab" phenomenon, resulted in a sharp decline in her literary reputation.

Despite the negative attention she received for Yellow Cab, Ieda continued to produce popular works; her 1994 novel Women Who Slept with the Bubble was made into a series of movies, the newest of which, starring Yoko Mitsuya, was released in June 2007.

Selected works

References

External links 
  
 
 
 
 

Japanese writers
1958 births
Living people
Writers from Aichi Prefecture
Shingon Buddhist monks
Japanese Buddhist nuns
21st-century Buddhist nuns